Przedbórz may refer to the following places:
Przedbórz, Kuyavian-Pomeranian Voivodeship (north-central Poland)
Przedbórz in Łódź Voivodeship (central Poland)
Przedbórz, Subcarpathian Voivodeship (south-east Poland)
Przedbórz, Masovian Voivodeship (east-central Poland)